3'-Fluoro-3'-deoxythymidine may refer to:

 Alovudine (fluorothymidine)
 Fluorothymidine F-18